Rakta Golapa is an Odia romantic tragedy released on 9 November 1977, starring Suresh Misra, Banaja Mohanty, Sriram Panda, Radha Panda and Ramesh Panigrahi.

Synopsis
Sharat and Mira meet at college and fall deeply in love. Sharat's family is against their love, and force Sharat into an arranged marriage with Sneha, who is in love with Ajay. On seeing the marriage, Mira tries to commit suicide and vanishes from the scene. Sharat can't bear the thought of Mira's fate and goes mad. He tries to avoid his wife Sneha and grows to hate her. In the meantime, Sneha becomes pregnant. Everybody doubts Sneha about the father of the child. Ajay comes to the fore to clear the confusion. At last Sharat and Mira unite.

Cast
 Suresh Mishra... Sharat
 Banaja Mohanty... Mira
 Sriram Panda... Ajay
 Vatchla... Sneha
 Radha Panda		
 Nityananda Das		
 Kunjananda		
 Braja		
 Ramesh Panigrahi		
 Shanti Lata Das		
 Halam... Dancer

Soundtrack
The music for the film was composed by Dhananjay Satpathy. It was his debut as music composer and singer.

Box office
Despite renowned actors, a good story and melodic music, the film was a box office flop. The reason being that the film was released in smaller towns and not in major cinemas.

References

External links
 

1977 films
1970s Odia-language films